Peter Gizzi (born 1959 in Alma, Michigan) is an American poet, essayist, editor and teacher. He attended New York University, Brown University and the State University of New York at Buffalo.

Life

Gizzi was born in Alma, Michigan to an Italian American family. He spent most of his childhood and adolescence in Pittsfield, Massachusetts. After graduating from high school, the poet delayed going to college and took a job in a factory winding resin tubes and in a residential treatment center working with emotionally disturbed adolescents. Working overnight at the treatment center, Gizzi read George Oppen's Collected Poems, along with H.D., Wallace Stevens, William Carlos Williams, Federico García Lorca, Baudelaire, Rimbaud "and almost anything published by Burning Deck." Living in New York City, in part to keep in touch with the punk scene, he walked by the St. Mark's book store one day and his eye was caught by a reprinted version of BLAST, with its shocking pink and diagonal title. He picked up a copy and read the manifestos. "I was home in that synthesis — Punk and Poetry had merged and I knew at once I wanted to edit my own journal and so I did," he later wrote.

By the late 1980s, he was waiting tables, reading and editing o•blék: a journal of language arts, which he founded in 1987 with Connell McGrath.

In 1991, he started editing the lectures of Jack Spicer for publication and went to SUNY Buffalo with support from Robert Creeley, Charles Bernstein, and Susan Howe, "and with the financial support (meager as it was) that working within an institution offered." In 1993, after eight years and 12 issues, he left o•blék, which soon folded.

Gizzi has taught at Brown University and The University of California, Santa Cruz. Since 2001, he has been a professor in the MFA Program for Poets & Writers at The University of Massachusetts Amherst. For several years, he was poetry editor at The Nation. He also is on the contributing editorial board to the literary journal Conjunctions. He is the brother of deceased poet Michael Gizzi.

Poetry
In 1992 Peter Gizzi published his first full-length collection, "Periplum" which won praise from critics. This was followed by "Artificial Heart", a collection which enhanced Gizzi's reputation as a lyric poet writing as a modern troubadour in a style which is allusive and oblique.

In 2003, "Some Values of Landscape and Weather" was published. The title poem of this collection is "a sustained examination of the relationship between public and private spaces, as well as a complex reflection on war".

The collection "The Outernationale" (2007) investigates language, knowledge and experience but combines this with an implied political stance.

"Threshold Songs" (2011) is a series of poetic elegies which also investigate the role of the lyric poet and show "the voice of the poet contemplating its relation to other voices".

Gizzi's most recent collection, "Archeophonics", continues his investigation of language; the title of the book refers to the excavation of lost sounds analogous to the process of archeology.

Awards and recognition
In 1994 he received the Lavan Younger Poets Award from the Academy of American Poets (selected by John Ashbery). Gizzi has also held residencies at The MacDowell Colony, Yaddo, The Foundation of French Literature at Royaumont, Un Bureau Sur L’Atlantique, and the Centre International de Poesie Marseille. He has received fellowships from The Fund For Poetry, The Rex Foundation, The Howard Foundation, The Foundation for Contemporary Arts Grants to Artists award (1998), and The John Simon Guggenheim Memorial Foundation. Gizzi has twice held the position of Poet-in-Residence in the English Faculty of the University of Cambridge. In 2016 Archeophonics was a finalist for the National Book Award.

Bibliography

Books
 Now It's Dark. Middletown: Wesleyan, 2020
 Sky Burial: New and Selected Poems. Manchester, UK: Carcanet, 2020
 Archeophonics. Middletown: Wesleyan, 2016
 In Defense of Nothing: Selected Poems 1987 –2011. Middletown: Wesleyan, 2014
 Threshold Songs. Middletown: Wesleyan, 2011
 The Outernationale. Middletown: Wesleyan, 2007
 Periplum and other poems, 1987 – 92. Cambridge, UK: Salt Publishers, 2004
 Some Values of Landscape and Weather. Middletown: Wesleyan, 2003
 Artificial Heart. Providence: Burning Deck, 1998 
 Periplum. Penngrove: Avec Books, 1992

Chapbooks and Limited Editions
 Ship of State. Kingston: The Brother in Elysium, 2020
 The Afterlife of Paper. Los Angeles: Catalpa, 2019
 New Poems. Kingston: The Brother in Elysium, 2017
 Field Recordings. Cambridge UK: Equipage Editions, 2016
 A Winding Sheet for Summer. Amsterdam NL: Tungsten Press, 2016
 Marigold & Cable: A Garland for the New Year. Cambridge UK: Materials, 2016
 The Winter Sun Says Fight. Plymouth UK: Periplum Editions, 2016
 Vincent, Homesick for the Land of Pictures. Rotterdam, NL: Studio 3005, 2015
 Marigold & Cable. Saint-Martin, France: Shelter Press, 2014
 In the Air. Los Angeles: Manor House, 2013
 Ode: Salute to the New York School 1950-1970. Tucson: Letter Machine, 2012 
 History Is Made at Night. Cincinnati: Students of Decay, 2011
 Pinocchio's Gnosis. Northampton: Song Cave, 2011
 In Song & Story. Amsterdam, NL: Tungsten Press, 2010
 Homer's Anger. Paris: Collectif Generation, 2009
 A Panic That Can Still Come Upon Me. Brooklyn, Ugly Ducking, 2006 
 From a Cinematographer's Letter. London: Tolling Elves. 2004
 Revival. New Haven: Phylum Press, 2002 
 Fin Amor. Oakland: Tougher Disguises, 2002 
 Chateâu If. Paris: Slacik Editions, 2000
 Add This to the House. Cambridge, UK: Equipage, 1999
 New Picnic Time. Buffalo: Meow Editions, 1995
 Ledger Domain. Providence: Timoleon, 1995
 Hours of the Book. Canary Islands, Spain: Zasterle Press, 1994
 Music for Films. Providence: Paradigm Press, 1992
 Creeley Madrigal. Providence: The Materials Press, 1991

Editing Projects

 My Vocabulary Did This to Me: The Collected Poetry of Jack Spicer. Co-edited with Kevin Killian. Middletown: Wesleyan, 2008
 The House that Jack Built: The Collected Lectures of Jack Spicer. Middletown: Wesleyan University, 1998
 Exact Change Yearbook. Boston: Exact Change Publishers / Manchester, UK: Carcanet, 1995
 o•blēk / a journal of language arts. 12 issues. Co-edited with Connell McGrath. 1987 - 93

Notes

External links
Peter Gizzi author page

1959 births
20th-century American poets
21st-century American poets
Academics of the University of Cambridge
American writers of Italian descent
Brown University alumni
Living people
New York University alumni
People from Alma, Michigan
People from Pittsfield, Massachusetts
Poets from Massachusetts
University at Buffalo alumni
University of Massachusetts Amherst faculty
Writers from Pittsfield, Massachusetts
American Book Award winners